Operation Yakhin was an operation to secretly emigrate Moroccan Jews to Israel, conducted by Israel's Mossad between November 1961 and spring 1964. About 97,000 left for Israel by plane and ship from Casablanca and Tangier via France and Italy.

The accession of Hassan II on 26 February 1961 enabled negotiations to begin on a secret agreement between Mossad's "Misgeret" division and the Moroccan authorities (principally Prince Moulay Ali and labour minister Abdelkader Benjelloun), together with the American organisation HIAS. An economic arrangement was agreed between Israel and Morocco, with the agreement of Israeli Prime Minister David Ben-Gurion and King Hassan II of Morocco, whereby $500,000 would be paid as a downpayment, plus $100 per emigrant for the first 50,000 Moroccan Jews, and then, $250 per emigrant thereafter. The operation also received important help from Francoist Spain. However, some Jews settled in France, Canada and the United States instead of in Israel. Morocco received "indemnities" for the loss of the Jews.

The operation was fronted by the New York-based Hebrew Immigrant Aid Society, who financed approximately $50 million of costs.

Etymology
The operation's name Yachin was of Biblical origin, being the name of one of the two central pillars that supported the Holy Temple built in Jerusalem by King Solomon, and because Israel regarded immigration as a major pillar that supported the existence of the Jewish state.

Background

The Jewish community of Morocco spans nearly 2,000 years. On May 14, 1948 – Sultan Muhammad V of Morocco delivered a speech in which he warned his country's Jews not to demonstrate "solidarity with the Zionist aggression," referring to the Declaration of the establishment of the State of Israel and the 1947–1949 Palestine war. During the Anti-Jewish Riots in Oujda and Jerada June 7–8, 1948, 44 Jews were killed in the northeastern Moroccan towns of Oujda and Jerada. This event contributed to a dramatic upsurge in the departure of Jews from Morocco, most of them to Israel. If before Oujda and Jereda there had been a stream of Jews departing Morocco, afterward  the immigration became even more extensive. During the next year, 18,000 of Morocco's 250,000 or so Jews left for Israel. Between 1948 and 1956, when emigration was prohibited, the number reached about 110,000. At the time, Morocco was home to the largest Jewish community in North Africa. Fears that Moroccan independence, which appeared increasingly likely through the early 1950s, would lead to persecution of the Jewish community led to an initial wave of migrants. From 1948 to 1951, approximately 28,000 Jews emigrated from Morocco to Israel.

Upon Moroccan independence from French colonial rule in 1956, full rights and status were conferred to the Jewish population under the subsequent reign of Mohammed V. Nonetheless, immigration to Israel continued. In 1959, under pressure from the Arab League and facing the specter of the Jewish population's continued decline, emigration to Israel was prohibited, narrowing Jews' options for leaving the country. Despite retention efforts, Moroccan immigration to Israel rose to approximately 95,000 Jews for the period spanning 1952–1960.

The formal prohibition on emigration remained in place only through February 1961. While the formal prohibition was ended, Mohammed V maintained a clear public preference that the Jewish community remain within Morocco and barred foreign action to facilitate or encourage emigration. Beginning in 1960, Israeli authorities engaged Moroccan officials in discussions intended to negotiate the facilitation of Jewish immigration to Israel with official (or, at least semi-official) blessing. Even with the removal of the prohibition on such movement, these talks continued. Eventually, this evolved into Operation Yakhin.

On 10 January 1961 a small boat called Egoz carrying 44 Jewish emigrants sank on the northern coast of Morocco. This created a crisis both for the Moroccan authorities and for the foreign aid groups responsible for assisting the refugees.

Impact 
In Kathy Wazana's 2013 film They Were Promised the Sea, Simon Levy—founder of the Moroccan Jewish Museum—noted that the trucks and planes that took the Jews away were Moroccan, which added to the trauma. Susan Gilson Miller described the departure of the majority of Jews from Morocco as "monumental national tragedy."

Notable people
Shas politician Ya'akov Margi, born in 1960, was brought to Israel during Operation Yachin in 1962.

See also
Operation Magic Carpet (Yemen)
Operation Ezra and Nehemiah
Moroccan Jews in Israel

References

Further reading
"North African Jewry in the twentieth century: the Jews of Morocco, Tunisia, and Algeria", by Michael M. Laskier, Chapter 7: The Israeli-Directed Self-Defense Underground and "Operation Yachin".
 

Aliyah operations
Jews and Judaism in Morocco
Non-combat military operations involving Israel
Jewish exodus from Arab and Muslim countries